Targavar Rural District is in Silvaneh District of Urmia County, West Azerbaijan province, Iran. At the National Census of 2006, its population was 7,893 in 1,344 households. There were 7,765 inhabitants in 1,603 households at the following census of 2011. At the most recent census of 2016, the population of the rural district was 8,381 in 1,862 households. The largest of its 39 villages was Mavana, with 1,314 people.

The district was home to a significant Assyrian population before the Assyrian genocide, but is mostly populated by Herki Kurds today.

See also 

 Emirate of Bradost
 Assyrian genocide
 List of Assyrian settlements
 Assyrian homeland
 Margawar

References 

Urmia County

Rural Districts of West Azerbaijan Province

Populated places in West Azerbaijan Province

Populated places in Urmia County

Places of the Assyrian genocide

Kurdish settlements in West Azerbaijan Province